A Farnell is a cocktail made with Jack Daniel's whiskey or often with whiskey from the High West Distillery mixed with lemonade.  The drink is usually served in an old-fashioned glass or a Collins glass with ice, and it is considered a lighter, less sweet alternative to a lynchburg lemonade.

History

The drink was first served at the Jeremy Ranch Golf Club clubhouse in Park City, Utah, and its popularity is spreading east.

Seasonality
The Farnell is designed to primarily be a summer drink, though the warm flavors of the whiskey mixed with the thirst-quenching properties of the lemonade and garnishes led to its adoption by the Après-ski set.

See also

 List of cocktails

References

See also
 Jack Daniel's
 High West Distillery

Cocktails with whisky
Cocktails with lemonade
Two-ingredient cocktails